Glitter is the debut EP by American hip hop artist 070 Shake. It was released by GOOD Music and Island Def Jam on March 23, 2018. It was promoted by the lead single "Stranger".

Background
070 Shake began making music with her 070 collective in late 2015 and was soon picked up by social media promoter YesJulz. GOOD Music president Pusha T found out about 070 Shake's music and signed her to the label in 2016.

Glitter was originally slated for a January 26 release and was to include 12 tracks. At the time of Glitters release, media outlets noted that her lyrical content concentrated on her self esteem issues, drug use, and sexuality. Shake described Glitter as "about being in a dark place and finding yourself and figuring it out. It's about being in the lowest of lows type of shit." The EP was released on March 23, 2018.

Track listing
All tracks produced by The Kompetition except "Somebody Like Me", produced by Razsy Beats and B Hall.

References

2018 debut EPs
070 Shake EPs
Def Jam Recordings EPs
GOOD Music EPs